George Clive (born 1720, died 23 March 1779) was a British politician.

Background
Clive was the son of Reverend Benjamin Clive, Vicar of Duffield, Derbyshire, and Susannah (née Floyer). His father was the uncle of Robert Clive, 1st Baron Clive ("Clive of India").

Political career
Clive was elected Member of Parliament for Bishop's Castle in 1763, a seat he held until his death 16 years later.

Family
Clive married Sidney, daughter of Thomas Bolton, in 1763. They had four known children:

Louisa (d. 16 Mar 1832), who married Frederick Keppel, son of Frederick Keppel, Bishop of Exeter. They had three sons.
Edward Clive (22 Jul 1845)
Theophilus, who married Fanny McClintock, daughter of John McClintock MP for Enniskillen. They had on son, Theophilus, who married Frances Caroline Somerset, daughter of Lord Robert Somerset.
Henry (d. 16 March 1848), who married Charlotte Jane Buller, but died without issue.

Clive died in March 1779.

References

Staatliche Museen zu Berlin

1779 deaths
1720 births
Members of the Parliament of Great Britain for English constituencies
British MPs 1761–1768
British MPs 1768–1774
British MPs 1774–1780
Year of birth unknown